"Beautiful U R" is a song by Canadian singer Deborah Cox. It was written by Cox along with Bobby Ross Avila, Issiah J. Avila, Johnny Najera, Sam Salter, Rick Thomson, and James "Big Jim" Wright for her fifth studio album The Promise (2008), while production was helmed by The Avila Brothers and Big Jim. The song was released as the album's second single in September 2008 and peaked at number 10 on the Canadian Hot 100.

Track listings

Charts

Weekly charts

Year-end charts

Certifications

References

2008 songs
2008 singles
Deborah Cox songs
Songs written by Sam Salter
Songs written by Deborah Cox